Colegio Max Uhle is a German international school in Arequipa, Peru. It serves years 1-12.

The school's activities began in 1956.

History 
In 1961 the school had 269 students, with 70 in kindergarten, 41 in transition, 138 in primary, and 20 in secondary. In 1967 it moved to its current site, which was a  campus built for 1,360,000 German marks, funded by the West German government. In 2002 the school began allowing preschool students after a 2001 installation of nine classrooms, funded by $530,000 USD on a  plot of land. , the school has over 1,100 students.

See also
 German Peruvian

References

External links
  Colegio Max Uhle

Arequipa
German international schools in Peru